Mariya Aleksandrovna Basarab (born 19 January 1990) is a Russian handball player for Rostov-Don and the Russian national team.

References

1990 births
Living people
Russian female handball players